The Exorcist is an American supernatural horror television series created by Jeremy Slater for Fox. Part of The Exorcist franchise, the series serves as a direct sequel to the original 1973 film and ignores the film's various sequels. Alfonso Herrera and Ben Daniels star as a pair of exorcists who investigate cases of demonic possession.

The series premiered on September 23, 2016, and a second season premiered on September 29, 2017, each comprising 10 episodes. After the conclusion of the second season, Fox canceled the series.

Cast

Main
 Alfonso Herrera as Father Tomas Ortega
 Ben Daniels as Father Marcus Keane
 Hannah Kasulka as Casey Rance (season 1; guest season 2)
 Brianne Howey as Kat Rance (season 1)
 Kurt Egyiawan as Father Bennett
 Alan Ruck as Henry Rance (season 1)
 Geena Davis as Angela Rance (season 1) 
 Li Jun Li as Rose Cooper (season 2)
 Brianna Hildebrand as Verity (season 2)
 John Cho as Andrew Kim (season 2)
 Zuleikha Robinson as Mouse (season 2)

Recurring
 Robert Emmet Lunney as The Salesman (season 1)
 Mouzam Makkar as Jessica (season 1)
 Kirsten Fitzgerald as Maria Walters
 Sharon Gless as Chris MacNeil (season 1)
 Camille Guaty as Olivia (season 1)
 Deanna Dunagan as Mother Bernadette (season 1)
 Torrey Hanson as Cardinal Guillot
 Francis Guinan as Brother Simon (season 1)
 Cyrus Arnold as David "Truck" Johnson III (season 2)
 Hunter Dillon as Caleb (season 2)
 Alex Barima as Shelby (season 2)
 Amélie Eve as Grace (season 2)
 Christopher Cousins as Peter Osborne (season 2)
 Alicia Witt as Nicole (season 2) 
 Zibby Allen as Cindy (season 2)
 Beatrice Kitsos as Harper (season 2)

Episodes

Season 1 (2016)

Season 2 (2017)

Production

Development
Jeremy Slater wrote the pilot. Fox ordered the pilot to be shot in January 2016. The series is described as "a propulsive, serialized psychological thriller following two very different men tackling one family's case of horrifying demonic possession, and confronting the face of true evil".

Casting
Brianne Howey was cast as Katherine Rance, while Hannah Kasulka was cast as Casey Rance. Alfonso Herrera and Ben Daniels were cast as Father Tomas and Father Marcus respectively, while Kurt Egyiawan was cast as Father Bennett. Geena Davis was cast as Angela Rance. Davis, Ruck, Kasulka and Howey did not return as regular cast members in the second season, while Herrera, Egyiawan and Daniels did return, as their characters preside over a new possession case. John Cho, Brianna Hildebrand, Zuleikha Robinson and Li Jun Li were cast in series regular roles for season two. Christopher Cousins and Cyrus Arnold were cast in recurring roles.

Filming
The first season of the show was shot in Chicago. Season two filming began in July 2017, in Vancouver.

Home media
DVDs for both seasons are available to purchase through Amazon.com beginning on July 10, 2018.

Reception

Ratings

Critical reception
The Exorcist has received generally positive reviews from critics. Review aggregator Rotten Tomatoes gives the first season a score of 79% based on 53 reviews with an average of 6.12/10. The consensus says: "The Exorcist doesn't come close to its classic source material, but still boasts a tense narrative that manages some legitimate scares and credible special effects." On Metacritic, the show has a weighted average of 62/100 based on 28 reviews, indicating "generally favorable reviews".

The second season received a score of 100% based on 11 reviews, with an average of 7.5/10. The consensus says: "The Exorcist continues to haunt in a more confident second season, with an assured storyline and mastery over its demonic flourishes."

Awards and nominations

References

External links
 

The Exorcist
2010s American drama television series
2010s American horror television series
2010s American LGBT-related drama television series
2010s American supernatural television series
2016 American television series debuts
2017 American television series endings
Alternative sequel television series
American horror fiction television series
American sequel television series
Demons in television
English-language television shows
Fox Broadcasting Company original programming
Live action television shows based on films
Catholic drama television series
Serial drama television series
Television series by 20th Century Fox Television
Television series by Morgan Creek Productions
Television shows based on American novels
Television shows set in Chicago
Television shows set in Seattle